The 2009 German Supercup, known as the Volkswagen SuperCup for sponsorship reasons, was an unofficial edition of the German Supercup, a football match contested by the winners of the previous season's Bundesliga and DFB-Pokal competitions.

The match was played at the Volkswagen Arena in Wolfsburg, and was contested by 2008–09 Bundesliga winners VfL Wolfsburg, and 2008–09 DFB-Pokal winners Werder Bremen. Bremen won the match 2–1 to claim the unofficial title.

Teams

Match

Details

See also
 2008–09 Bundesliga
 2008–09 DFB-Pokal

References

Unofficial 2009
VfL Wolfsburg matches
SV Werder Bremen matches
2009–10 in German football cups